The Fall of the Families is a novel by Phillip Mann published in 1987, a sequel of Master of Paxwax from 1986.

Plot summary
The Fall of the Families is a novel in which oppressed aliens free themselves from rule by humans.

Reception
Dave Langford reviewed The Fall of the Families for White Dwarf #92, and stated that "The conclusion is oddly satisfying, but I was dubious about some the psychological manipulations en route."

Reviews
Review by Dan Chow (1987) in Locus, #316 May 1987
Review by Barbara Davies (1987) in Vector, #139
Review by John Clute (1987) in Interzone, #22 Winter 1987

References

1987 science fiction novels